Swedish Television's Christmas calendar or Swedish Television's Advent calendar is a Christmas calendar TV series mainly for children, broadcast by Sveriges Television (Sweden's Television) since 1960 and has developed into an essential part of contemporary Swedish Christmas tradition.

Every series consists of 24 episodes (with a few exceptions), broadcast daily 1–24 December. The theme for most series have some connection to Christmas. Prior to 1971, it was called Adventskalendern. Sveriges Radio also has a tradition of broadcasting a similar series on the radio each year and prior to 1973, it was always the same series on the radio and on TV (with a few differences in adaptation, depending on the medium), but since then, it has been a different series on the radio and on TV. In the beginning, the series began on Advent Sunday, but nowadays, it always starts on 1 December; it has always ended on Christmas Eve (24 December). Thus, for instance, the 1967 series Gumman som blev liten som en tesked had only 22 episodes, since the Advent Sunday of that year was 3 December.

Along with each series, there is always the opportunity to buy a paper calendar with a window to open each day. These are available in most Swedish retail outlets, shops, supermarkets etc. and the windows usually contain images of something to do with the plot of that day's episode.

Every series from 1988 onwards has been released on DVD, as well as some series before that. From the 1980s, all but the 1980 and 1987 series have been released. From the 1960s, the 1967 and 1969 series are available and from the 1970s, the 1972, 1973, 1974, 1977, 1978 and 1979 series are available. Until 2011, the older series were released by Pan Vision, but from 2012, distribution has been taken over by Scanbox Entertainment. There are usually two or three new series releases in the autumn each year.

List

See also
Jullovsmorgon
Sommarlovsmorgon
Sveriges Radio's Christmas Calendar

References

Further reading

External links
 
 

 
Swedish children's television series
1960s Swedish television series
1970s Swedish television series
1980s Swedish television series
1990s Swedish television series
2000s Swedish television series
2010s Swedish television series
1960 Swedish television series debuts
Christmas television specials
Swedish television miniseries